Robert Gray (born September 6, 1971) is an American former politician. He served in the South Dakota Senate from 2005 to 2012. From 2007 to 2012, he served as President pro tempore of the Senate.

References

1971 births
Living people
Republican Party South Dakota state senators